"Ma beauté" is a song by Congolese-French singer and rapper Maître Gims released in 2016.

Music video 
The song's music video was released in June 2016 and was shot in the Côte d'Azur in France. It garnered over 64 million views.

Charts

Certifications

References 

2016 singles
Gims songs
French-language songs
2016 songs